Rumia Janowo railway station is a railway station serving the town of Rumia, in the Pomeranian Voivodeship, Poland. The station opened in 1870 and is located on the Gdańsk Śródmieście–Rumia railway. The train services are operated by SKM Tricity.

Train services
The station is served by the following service(s):

Szybka Kolej Miejska services (SKM) (Lębork -) Wejherowo - Reda - Rumia - Gdynia - Sopot - Gdansk

References 

 This article is based upon a translation of the Polish language version as of October 2016.

Railway stations in Poland opened in 1870
Railway stations served by Szybka Kolej Miejska (Tricity)
Wejherowo County